The 1896–97 season was the 26th season of competitive football in England.

Overview

Aston Villa became the second team (after Preston North End) to complete "the Double" of winning the Football League Championship and the FA Cup.  No other team would complete the double for 64 years.

The Cup Final was played on 10 April 1897 between Aston Villa and Everton. At the start of the day, the top of the league table looked thus:

Consequently, with a total of 30 league games to play in the season, only Derby County had any "mathematical" possibility of overtaking Aston Villa to take the title. To do so, they would have needed to take at least seven points from their remaining four games, with Aston Villa losing their remaining three games. In the event, Derby lost 1–0 at Bury and Aston Villa were thus confirmed as League Champions on the same day that they went on to win the Cup. As a result, Villa became the first, and so far, only team to date to achieve the league and cup "double" on the same day.

Honours

Notes = Number in parentheses is the times that club has won that honour. * indicates new record for competition

Football League

First Division

The First Division was won by Aston Villa.

Second Division

Notts County won the Second Division and were elected to the First Division after winning a Test Match against Burnley. Following the failure of Rotherham Town, Burslem Port Vale and Crewe Alexandra to be re-elected into the Football League, Blackpool and Gainsborough Trinity joined the Second Division. Walsall (formerly Walsall Town Swifts) also returned after a season away.

Southern League

References

External links